The 2022 Saudi Super Cup (also known as The Berain Saudi Super Cup for sponsorship reasons) was the 9th edition of the Saudi Super Cup, an annual football competition for clubs in the Saudi Arabia football league system that were successful in its major competitions in the preceding season.

On 19 February 2022, it was announced that the competition would be changed from a two-team format to four teams, which would include a semi-final round. The winners and runners-up of the Saudi Professional League and the King Cup would take part in the competition. The semi-final round was played on 26 January 2023, and the final was held on 29 January.

Al-Ittihad defeated Al-Fayha 2–0 in the final to win their first title.

Qualification
The tournament was supposed to feature the winners and runners-up of the 2021–22 King Cup and 2021–22 Saudi Professional League. However, since Al-Hilal were Pro League winners and King Cup runners-up, the extra spot was awarded to the Pro League third-placed team Al-Nassr.

Qualified teams
The following four teams qualified for the tournament.

Draw
The draw was held on 24 December at the SSC headquarters in Riyadh. There was no restriction in it.

Matches
 Times listed are UTC+3.

Bracket

Semi-finals

Final

References

External links

Saudi Super Cup
2022–23 in Saudi Arabian football
Sports competitions in Saudi Arabia
January 2023 sports events in Saudi Arabia